Piklihal is a village near Mudgal in the Lingasugur taluk of Raichur district in Karnataka state, India. Piklihal is a neolithic period site. The site was excavated by  F. Raymond Allchin in 1952. Piklihal is 6 km south to Mudgal town.
The Neolithic settlers in piklihal were cattle -  herders they domesticated cattle ,sheep ,goats etc. They setup seasonal camps surrounded by cowpens made with posts stakes .

See also
 Maski
 Hatti
 Mudgal
 Tekkalakote
 Jaladurga
 Raichur
 Districts of Karnataka

References

Further reading
 

Villages in Raichur district
Archaeological sites in Karnataka